District #10 Schoolhouse is a historic One-room school located at Hartland in Niagara County, New York.  It is a one-story cobblestone structure built about 1845 in the Greek Revival style.  It features smooth, slight irregularly shaped, variously colored cobbles in its construction. It operated as a school until 1947 when it was converted into a private residence.  It was recently acquired by the Hartland Historical Society.  It is one of approximately 47 cobblestone structures in Niagara County.

It was listed on the National Register of Historic Places in 2000.

References

External links
Information on the Hartland Historical Society

One-room schoolhouses in New York (state)
Schoolhouses in the United States
School buildings on the National Register of Historic Places in New York (state)
School buildings completed in 1845
Greek Revival architecture in New York (state)
Cobblestone architecture
Buildings and structures in Niagara County, New York
National Register of Historic Places in Niagara County, New York
1845 establishments in New York (state)